The 52nd ISSF World Shooting Championships were held in Changwon, South Korea from 2 to 14 September 2018.

This also served as first qualification for  2020 Summer Olympics.

Medal summary

Senior

Medal table

Men

Women

Mixed

Junior
Due to shortage of athletes some events are conducted as "Grand Prix" only.

  Double Trap Men Junior - Individual and Team
  10m Running Target Men Junior Team
  10m Running Target Mixed Men Junior Team
  50m Running Target Men Junior Team
  50m Running Target Mixed Men Junior Team
  10m Running Target Women Junior - Individual and Team
  10m Running Target Mixed Women Junior - Individual and Team

This events not computed at the medal table and marked with blue.

Medal table

Men

Women

Mixed

References

External links

ISSF website

2018
2018 in shooting sports
International sports competitions hosted by South Korea
2018 in South Korea
2018 in South Korean sport
Shooting competitions in South Korea
Sport in Changwon
September 2018 sports events in South Korea